Jerry Green may refer to:
Jerry Green (American football) (born 1936), American football player
Jerry Green (basketball, born 1980), American basketball player
Jerry Green (basketball coach), American college basketball coach
Jerry Green (economist) (born 1946), American economist
Jerry Green (politician) (1939-2018), American politician in New Jersey
Jerry Green (writer), American sports journalist and author

See also
Jerry Greene, founder of Collectables Records
Jeremy Green (born 1971), sports columnist and NFL studio analyst
Gerald Green (disambiguation)